Jablonec nad Jizerou is a town in Semily District in the Liberec Region of the Czech Republic. It has about 1,600 inhabitants.

Administrative parts
Villages of Blansko, Bratrouchov, Buřany, Dolní Dušnice, Dolní Tříč, Horní Dušnice, Hradsko, Končiny, Stromkovice and Vojtěšice are administrative parts of Jablonec nad Jizerou.

Etymology

The name Jablonec was probably derived from the Old Czech word jabloncje ("little apple tree"), which was a common tree in the location. Due to its location, there is one more possible explanation of the name origin, it could originate from the Latin gabella, meaning "the customs station".

In 1916 or 1921, the attribute nad Jizerou ("above the Jizera") was added to distinguish from the city of Jablonec nad Nisou.

Geography
It lies on the Jizera River. The municipal territory lies in the Giant Mountains Foothills and extends into the Giant Mountains in the east.

History
The first written mention of Jablonec is from 1492.

Until the Thirty Years' War, Jablonec was a small non-agricultural village of thirteen houses, but the significance of the village indicates the existence of the parish church. The Thirty Years' War (1618–1648) had a catastrophic impact on Jablonec – only four houses remained. It took hundred years before Jablonec recovered from the war.

An already medieval built-up area, which is probably to be found in the vicinity of the Church of Saint Procopius (originally wooden, from bricks since 1777 thanks to the support of Ernst Adalbert von Harrach) had more diffusive character, also the area from the second half of the 18th century was almost out of order on the slope of the valley.

The only organizational factors were contour lines and parcels of land, a completely non-agricultural dwelling were chaotically centered on the link between the church and the mill. Thanks to the large reconstruction of the market town connected with the construction of the railway (1899) and the textile factories along the Jizera, Jablonec nad Jizerou gained the character of a modern mountainous town.

In the second half of the 19th century, Jablonec grew rapidly, and in 1896, Jablonec was given the status of a market town by Emperor Franz Joseph I. At this time Jablonec was also given the new coat of arms.

In 1971, Jablonec nad Jizerou was awarded with the status of a town.

Today among the new buildings from the turn of the 19th and 20th centuries and from the interwar period are sporadically preserved timbered houses.

Demographics

Sport

Twin towns – sister cities

Jablonec nad Jizerou is twinned with:
 Sulzbach, Germany

Gallery

References

External links

Cities and towns in the Czech Republic
Populated places in Semily District
Ski areas and resorts in the Czech Republic